Stavros "Stav" Danaos (born 8 April 1978) is an English  weather presenter of Greek Cypriot descent. He currently presents the BBC's national weather forecast and has previously worked for Reporting Scotland.

Career
In 2006, Stav applied to join the BBC Weather Centre as a presenter. He joined the team and began presenting forecasts in February 2007. He began presenting for regional BBC news channels such as Reporting Scotland. He has also done presenting work in Newcastle, Northern Ireland and Birmingham. Danaos joined the BBC's national news channel to present regular forecasts in 2013.

References

1978 births
Living people
English meteorologists
English television presenters
English people of Greek Cypriot descent
BBC newsreaders and journalists
BBC weather forecasters